The Atascosa River is a river tributary of the Frio River, which is tributary of the  Nueces River in Texas.

See also
List of rivers of Texas

References

USGS Geographic Names Information Service
USGS Hydrologic Unit Map - State of Texas (1974)

Rivers of Texas
Bodies of water of Atascosa County, Texas
Tributaries of the Nueces River
Atascosa County, Texas